Fossli Hotel is a hotel situated at Vøringsfossen on top of Måbødalen, in the municipality of Eidfjord in Vestland county, Norway. 
Fossli Hotel is situated just off Rv7  on top of the mountain, overlooking the Måbødalen valley and the Vøringfossen waterfall.  
The hotel owns a Zimmermann piano where Edvard Grieg composed his Norwegian Folk Songs, Opus 66, in 1896. It welcomed its first guests in 1887 and was finally completed in 1891.

History

Ola L. Garen (1857–1915) got the idea to build the hotel in the 1880s. At that time there was only a walking track to the top of Vøringsfossen. English tourists had previously suggested that a hotel would become a world attraction. However to make  these plans come true, Garen had to have a better way to transport the building materials so that the horses might climb up the Måbødalen. A new road was built and named Tømmerløypet. Fossli Hotel was designed by architect Fredrik Konow Lund (1889-1970) in   Art Nouveau style.

Attractions
Fossli Hotel naturally attracts many visitors because of the magnificent Vøringsfossen. Over the years, it has been visited by writers,  musicians and royal physician. Edvard Grieg lived in the hotel in the summer of 1896, and composed Norwegian Folk Songs, Opus 66, here. There is still a piano on site made in 1896 by Zimmermann factory in Leipzig, as Edvard Grieg once played on it. The hotel has been in the ownership of the Garen family for four generations, and currently is run by Erik Garen,  great-grandson of founder Ola Garen.

See also
Lyric Pieces

References

External links
Fossli Hotel website
Attribution
This article is based on the translation of the corresponding article of the Norwegian Wikipedia. A list of contributors can be found there at the History section.

Art Nouveau architecture in Norway
Art Nouveau hotels
Hotels in Vestland
Hotels established in 1887
Hotel buildings completed in 1891
1891 establishments in Norway
Tourist attractions in Vestland